Polycarpa aurata, also known as the ox heart ascidian, the gold-mouth sea squirt  or the ink-spot sea squirt, is a species of tunicate in the family Styelidae.

Description
It has an urn-shaped, hollow body with two siphons, one at the top and the other on the side. The body colour of this tunicate is white with purple and orange patches and purple lines. The inside is yellow or orange and this is visible around the rim of the siphons.

Distribution
This species is found in the tropical eastern Indian Ocean and the western Pacific Ocean. Its range includes the Philippines, Indonesia and northern Australia.

Biology
Tunicates feed by drawing water in through the branchial siphon at the top, filtering out phytoplankton, bacteria and other food particles, before expelling the water through the atrial siphon at the side. Sometimes hydroids and algae grow on the outside of the tunicate and nudibranchs such as Nembrotha lineolata sometimes feed on it.

References

External links

 Image
 Image
 

Stolidobranchia
Fauna of the Indian Ocean
Fauna of the Pacific Ocean
Animals described in 1834
Taxa named by Jean René Constant Quoy
Taxa named by Joseph Paul Gaimard
Marine fauna of Northern Australia
Fauna of the Philippines 
Fauna of Indonesia 
Fauna of Papua New Guinea 
Fauna of Timor